This is a list of ceremonial counties in England by gross value added for the year 2013. Data is gathered by the Office for National Statistics (ONS) and is given in terms of Nomenclature of Territorial Units for Statistics (NUTS), statistical area codes used for the European Union, which loosely follow administrative units of the United Kingdom.

Gross value added (GVA) is a measure of the value of goods and services produced in a localized area without considering taxes and subsidies (unlike gross domestic product (GDP)). Additionally, the ONS's estimates on GVA adapt to regional disparities in commuting regions by allocating the GVA to the area in which an employee commuted from. They also use five-period moving averages to smooth data.

Table

See also 
 List of UK cities by GVA
 List of ceremonial counties of England

Notes

Sources 

Economies by county in England